Rairangpur is a constituency of the Odisha Legislative Assembly, in Mayurbhanj district, Odisha.

Area of this constituency includes Rairangpur, Rairangpur block, Bahalda block, Jamda block and Tiring block.

In the latest 2019 election, Bharatiya Janata Party candidate, Naba Charan Majhi, defeated BJD candidate, Basanti Marandi, by a margin of 2847 votes.

Members of the Legislative Assembly 

14 elections held during 1951 to 2009. List of members elected from Rairangpur Vidhan Sabha constituency are:

Election results

2019

2014

2009

2004

2000

See also
List of constituencies of the Odisha Legislative Assembly
Mayurbhanj district

References

Politics of Mayurbhanj district
Assembly constituencies of Odisha